The 2014–15 Bulgarian women's football championship was the 30th season of women's league football under the Bulgarian Football Union.

The season was played from 7 September 2014 to the end of May 2015. The defending champions were NSA Sofia.

FC NSA Sofia won their 12th consecutive championship and qualified to the 2015–16 UEFA Women's Champions League.

League table

References

External links
Women's Football Bulgarian Football Union
Premier League Women 2015 Soccrway

Bulgaria
Women